The 2018 NCAA Men's National Collegiate Volleyball Tournament was the 49th annual tournament to determine the national champion of NCAA Division I and Division II men's collegiate indoor volleyball. The single-elimination tournament began on April 26 with a play-in match, with the remainder of the tournament hosted by UCLA from May 1–5 at Pauley Pavilion in Los Angeles. Long Beach State became the Champions for the second time in school history with a 5-set victory over UCLA.

Qualification
With the addition of the Big West Conference, which began sponsoring men's volleyball in the 2018 season, to the ranks of automatic qualifying conferences, the tournament expanded from six teams to seven.

Since the 2015 season, the first after the completion of the transition of the last Division III institution competing at the National Collegiate level, Rutgers–Newark, to Division III volleyball, only NCAA men's volleyball programs from Division I and Division II have been eligible for this tournament. Five automatic bids are given to the five conference postseason tournament winners. The two remaining teams are given at-large bids by the NCAA men's volleyball tournament Committee.

Bids

Tournament bracket 
 The seven teams were seeded according to the same methods used to seed the teams in previous tournaments. As in recent tournaments, the top two seeds will receive byes into the semifinals.
 The bottom two seeds contested a "play-in" match on April 26 at the 6 seed's home court.
 Two quarterfinal matches were held at Pauley Pavilion on the campus of UCLA on May 1. (#4 vs. play-in winner; #3 vs. #5 seed)
 The semifinals were held at Pauley Pavilion on May 3. (#1 vs. #4–play-in winner; #2 vs. #3–#5 winner)
 The 2018 NCAA Championship match was held at Pauley Pavilion on May 5.

Schedule and results

All-Tournament Team 
T.J DeFalco – Long Beach State
Kyle Ensing – Long Beach State
Daenan Gyimah – UCLA
Jake Hanes – Ohio State
Micah Ma'a – UCLA
Nicolas Szerszen – Ohio State
Josh Tuaniga – Long Beach State (Most Outstanding Player)

See also 
 NCAA Men's Volleyball Championships (Divisions I & II, Division III)
 NCAA Women's Volleyball Championships (Division I, Division II, Division III)

References

2018
NCAA Men's Volleyball Championship
NCAA Men's Volleyball Championship
2018 in sports in California
2018 NCAA Division I & II men's volleyball season
Volleyball in California